Cartoon Crossroads Columbus (CXC) is an annual, free, four-day celebration of cartooning and graphic novels held in Columbus, Ohio. Venues for the festival include Ohio State University's Billy Ireland Cartoon Library & Museum, Hale Hall, and the Wexner Center for the Arts; and downtown Columbus' Columbus Metropolitan Library, the Columbus Museum of Art, and the Columbus College of Art and Design.

CXC is held in the spirit of European conventions like the Angoulême International Comics Festival. As such, it is focused on the art and literature of the comics form, and only minimally on related pop-culture expression and merchandising. The show tends to highlight the "alternative comics" genre, as opposed to the work of "mainstream" publishers like DC Comics and Marvel Comics. Cosplaying is rarely if ever a feature of CXC. In addition to the "CXC Expo and Marketplace" (held in the Columbus Metropolitan Library), CXC features art exhibits, animation screenings, panel discussions, and workshops.

Cartoon Crossroads Columbus gives out an annual Emerging Artist Prize; the CXC has also distributed Master Cartoonist awards and a Transformative Work Award, and since 2021 the Tom Spurgeon Award.

Cartoon Crossroads Columbus was founded in 2015 by, among others, Columbus-based cartoonist Jeff Smith. Smith serves as the festival's president and artistic director. Tom Spurgeon served as Executive Director until his death in November 2019. The current Executive Director is Jay Kalagayan.

CXC is held in conjunction each year with SÕL-CON: The Brown And Black Comics Expo, also held in Columbus, founded in 2015 by comics scholars Frederick Aldama, John Jennings, and Ricardo Padilla.

History 
The CXC website details the origins of the convention:

Katie Skelly was awarded the inaugural Emerging Artist Prize at the 2015 Cartoon Crossroads Columbus. 

Carol Tyler was declared a Master Cartoonist at the 2016 CXC; that same year the festival expanded to four days.

In 2017, Kat Fajardo was the recipient of the Emerging Talent Award, and Laura Park was the recipient of Columbus Museum of Art Columbus Comics Residency.

The 2019 show featured a keynote event conversation between Mike Mignola and Jeff Smith. It also featured a history of British animation (selected by the British Film Institute)<ref>Tonguette, Peter. [https://www.columbusalive.com/entertainmentlife/20190926/british-animators-get-their-turn-in-spotlight-at-wexner-event British animators get their turn in the spotlight at Wexner event,"] Columbus Dispatch (Sep 26, 2019).</ref> and a panel discussion on the impact of the presidency of Donald Trump on political cartooning.

The 2020 show was held entirely online due to the COVID-19 pandemic. The 2021 show was a mixture of live and virtual events; that year also saw the introduction of the Tom Spurgeon Award, "to honor an individual who has made substantial contributions to the field but is not primarily a cartoonist."

 Dates and locations 

 Awards 

 Emerging Artist Prize 
 2015 Katie Skelly
 2016 Kevin Czapiewski
 2017 Kat Fajardo
 2018 Keren Katz
 2019 Carta Monir
 2021 Robyn Smith
 2022 Victoria Douglas

 Master Cartoonist 
 2016 Carol Tyler
 2019 P. Craig Russell
 2021 Shary Flenniken

 Transformative Work Award 
 2019 Matt Bors
 2021 Alison Bechdel's Fun Home''

Tom Spurgeon Award 
 2021
 Mollie Slott
 Orrin C. Evans
 Kim Thompson

See also 
 Small Press and Alternative Comics Expo
 ECBACC

References

External links
 

Comics conventions in the United States
Recurring events established in 2015
Conventions in Ohio
Comics awards